The Baritú National Park is a national park in Argentina, located in Santa Victoria Department, in the north of Salta Province, in the Argentine Northwest. The park borders Bolivia (Tarija Department), and its only road access is through that country.

The park was created in 1974. It is bordered by mountains. The protected area belongs to the Southern Andean Yungas ecoregion, which is located in the Sub-Andean mountain range, with heights averaging .

The fauna of the park includes several endangered species, such as the jaguar and the onza.

The cedro salteño trees ("Salta cedrelas") reach huge sizes in this region. Their wood is considered extremely valuable.

Gallery

See also 
 South America

Sources 
Administración de Parques Nacionales - National Parks Administration of Argentina (in Spanish and English)

National parks of Argentina
Protected areas of Salta Province
Protected areas established in 1974
Southern Andean Yungas